St. Mary's Church is a large Lutheran church located in Stralsund, northern Germany. Built some time before 1380, it is architecturally Gothic, an outstanding example of the Brick Gothic style prevalent in northern Germany and in the Baltic states. As part of the historic centre of Stralsund, the church was inscribed on the UNESCO World Heritage List in 2002.
 
The bell tower collapsed in 1382, and was rebuilt by 1478. In 1495, the steeple tower blew down during a severe storm, and was then rebuilt taller. This was subsequently struck by lightning in 1647, and burned down, and was rebuilt as a baroque dome, which, completed in 1708, can be seen today.

The main organ built by Friedrich Stellwagen between 1653 and 1659 is one of the famous large baroque organs in Europe.

See also
 List of tallest structures built before the 20th century

References

External links 

 European Route of Brick Gothic

Note: Spire of Lincoln Cathedral, versus other possible medieval cathedral spires (like Lincoln's, all since destroyed), is an item of debate amongst experts. Feel free to see List of tallest buildings and structures#History and Lincoln Cathedral for more information.

Brick Gothic
Buildings and structures in Vorpommern-Rügen
Lutheran churches converted from Roman Catholicism
Lutheran churches in Mecklenburg-Western Pomerania
Mary
Stralsund Mary